The Definitive Anthology is the third greatest hits album by Australian rock musician Richard Clapton. The album was released in October 1999 to coincide with his induction into the ARIA Hall of Fame at the ARIA Music Awards of 1999. The album covers songs from his career in chronological order, including two new tracks. The album peaked at number 28 on the ARIA Charts.

Talking about the track selection Clapton said "It was not a simple project, as there is so much music and culling it was painful at times. But it was a lot of fun. I looked back at my earlier songs when I was compiling this and I found that the naivete of some of them was really quite cute. I had a lot of fun with it."

Reception
Warner Music said "One of the beauties of the Richard Clapton Definitive Anthology is simply the timelessness of his songs. The music, the song structures, the imagery and that distinctive voice all combines to create a sense of warmth and knowing, but doesn't allow any song to be pigeon-holed into any particular time frame." Continuing to say "From the opening bar of track one, to the final moments of the album, this is an astonishing bed of work from a singer, performer and master songwriter- an artist who has been as much a part of the musical lives of hippies, surfers, inner city dwellers and corporate suits. There is no song that you will skip past and no song that is not familiar. It's actually amazing just how many times you'll find yourself singing along to songs that you didn't realise you knew. Such is the power and subtle skills of Richard's words and blissful waves of gentle rock."

Track listing

Charts

Certification

Release history

References 

Richard Clapton albums
1999 compilation albums
Compilation albums by Australian artists